Kang Jiaqi (born 19 July 1997) is a female former tennis player from China.

In her career, she won one singles title and two doubles titles on tournaments of the ITF Circuit. On 26 November 2018, she achieved her best doubles rankings of world No. 198.

Kang made her WTA Tour main-draw debut at the 2015 Tianjin Open where she was given a wildcard into the doubles event, partnering Zhang Shuai.

ITF Circuit finals

Singles: 2 (1 title, 1 runner-up)

Doubles: 10 (2 titles, 8 runner-ups)

External links
 
 

1997 births
Living people
Chinese female tennis players
Tennis players from Tianjin
LGBT tennis players
Chinese LGBT sportspeople
21st-century Chinese women